Selexipag, sold under the brand name Uptravi, is a medication developed by Actelion for the treatment of pulmonary arterial hypertension (PAH). Selexipag and its active metabolite, ACT-333679 (or MRE-269, the free carboxylic acid), are agonists of the prostacyclin receptor, which leads to vasodilation in the pulmonary circulation. It is taken by mouth or administered intravenously.

It is available as a generic medication.

Contraindications
In Europe, use of selexipag together with strong inhibitors of the liver enzyme CYP2C8, such as gemfibrozil, is contraindicated because it increases concentrations of selexipag twofold, and its active metabolite 11-fold, potentially leading to more adverse effects.

Adverse effects
The adverse effects of selexipag are similar to those of intravenous prostacyclins used for pulmonary arterial hypertension. Common side effects include headache and jaw pain. An increased risk for hyperthyroidism has also been noted in people taking selexipag.

Pharmacology

Mechanism of action

Selexipag and its active metabolite ACT-333679 act on the prostacyclin receptor of lung tissue, with the latter being 37-fold more potent. They are selective for the prostacyclin receptor. Binding to this receptor leads to three major effects: increased vasodilation of the arteries, decreased cell proliferation and inhibition of platelet aggregation, all beneficial in the treatment of pulmonary arterial hypertension.

Pharmacokinetics
Selexipag is quickly absorbed from the gut and hydrolyzed in the intestines and the liver to ACT-333679 by carboxylesterases. Absolute bioavailability is about 49%, most likely because of a high first-pass effect. Highest concentrations in the blood plasma are reached after one to three hours for selexipag and after three to four hours for the active metabolite. When in the circulation, about 99% of both substances are bound to plasma proteins, namely to albumin and alpha-1-acid glycoprotein to equal amounts.

The liver enzymes CYP2C8 and, to a lesser extent, CYP3A4, hydroxylate and dealkylate the active substance, thereby inactivating it. Besides, ACT-333679 is glucuronidized by the enzymes UGT1A3 and UGT2B7. The terminal half-life of selexipag is 0.8 to 2.5 hours, that of the active metabolite is 6.2 to 13.5 hours.

History
The U.S. Food and Drug Administration (FDA) granted selexipag orphan drug status for PAH. It was approved by the FDA on 22 December 2015.

In Europe, the drug was approved in May 2016.

Society and culture

Economics 
The expected price for the drug in the US is $160,000 to $170,000 per patient before rebates.

References

External links 
 
 

Acetamides
Drugs acting on the cardiovascular system
Japanese brands
Pyrazines
Sulfonamides
Isopropylamino compounds
Carboxamides
Ethers